Big Fish is a 2003 American fantasy comedy-drama film directed by Tim Burton, and based on the 1998 novel of the same name by Daniel Wallace. The film stars Ewan McGregor, Albert Finney, Billy Crudup, Jessica Lange, Helena Bonham Carter, Alison Lohman, Robert Guillaume, Marion Cotillard, Steve Buscemi, and Danny DeVito. The film tells the story of a frustrated son who tries to distinguish fact from fiction in his dying father's life.

Screenwriter John August read a manuscript of the novel six months before it was published and convinced Columbia Pictures to acquire the rights. August began adapting the novel while producers negotiated with Steven Spielberg who planned to direct after finishing Minority Report (2002). Spielberg considered Jack Nicholson for the role of Edward Bloom, but eventually dropped the project to focus on Catch Me If You Can (2002). Tim Burton and Richard D. Zanuck took over after completing Planet of the Apes (2001) and brought Ewan McGregor and Albert Finney on board.

The film's theme of reconciliation between a dying father and his son had special significance for Burton, as his father had died in 2000 and his mother in 2002, a month before he signed on to direct. Big Fish was shot on location in Alabama in a series of fairy tale vignettes evoking the tone of a Southern Gothic fantasy. Big Fish premiered on December 4, 2003, at the Hammerstein Ballroom and was released in limited capacity on December 10, 2003, by Columbia Pictures followed by a wide release on January 9, 2004. It garnered mostly positive reviews from critics, and grossed $122.9 million against a $70 million budget. The film received award nominations in multiple film categories, including four Golden Globe Award nominations, seven nominations from the British Academy of Film and Television Arts, two Saturn Award nominations, and an Oscar and a Grammy Award nomination for Danny Elfman's original score. The set for the town of Spectre still remains and can be found in Wetumpka, Alabama at Jackson Lake Island.

Plot
At Will Bloom's wedding party in 2000, his father Edward recalls the day Will was born, claiming he caught an enormous catfish using his wedding ring as bait. Will, having heard these stories all his life, believes them to be lies and falls out with his father.

Three years later in 2003, Edward has cancer, so Will and his pregnant French wife Joséphine return to the town of Ashton, Alabama, to spend time with him. During the plane ride, Will recalls a story of Edward's childhood encounter with a witch in 1932, who shows him his death in her glass eye. Edward, in spite of his illness, continues to tell the story of his life to Will and Joséphine. He claims to have once been bedridden for three years due to his rapid growth spurts. He then became a locally famous sportsman before being driven by his ambition to leave his hometown.

In 1944, he sets out into the world with a misunderstood giant, Karl, who was terrorizing the town by eating livestock from the surrounding farms. Edward and Karl find a fork in the road and travel down separate paths. Edward follows a path through a swamp and discovers the secret town of Spectre, the cheery locals claiming he was expected. There, he befriends Ashton poet Norther Winslow and the mayor's daughter, Jenny. However, Edward leaves Spectre, unwilling to settle down but promising Jenny he will return.

Edward and Karl reunite and visit the Calloway Circus in 1948, where Edward falls in love with a beautiful young woman. Karl and Edward get jobs in the circus, where the ringmaster Amos Calloway reveals to Edward one detail about the woman at the end of every month. Three years later in 1951, Edward discovers that Amos is secretly a werewolf and is attacked by him, but avoids getting him shot with a silver bullet by playing fetch until he turns back into human in the morning. Amos, upon returning to normal, reveals the woman's name to be Sandra Templeton, and that she attends Auburn University.

Edward travels to Auburn, and stalks Sandra for many days, even going so far as to plant thousands of daffodils outside of her sorority house bedroom. She tells him that she is engaged to Edward's childhood peer, Don Price. Don brutally beats up Edward, prompting Sandra to break off their engagement and marry Edward. Not long after, Don dies of a heart attack, as the witch had prophesied.

Shortly after, Edward is drafted into the army in 1952, and sent to fight in the Korean War, He parachutes into the middle of a North Korean military show, steals important documents, and convinces Siamese twins Ping and Jing to help him go home in exchange for making them celebrities. Upon returning home, Edward becomes a travelling salesman and crosses paths with Winslow, in 1963. He unwittingly helps Winslow rob a failing bank with no money, and later inspires the poet to work on Wall Street. Winslow becomes a wealthy broker and repays Edward with ten thousand dollars, which Edward uses to obtain his dream house.

In the present, Will investigates the truth behind his father's tales and travels to Spectre. He meets an older Jenny, who explains that in 1968, Edward rescued the town from bankruptcy by buying it in an auction and rebuilt it with help from his friends with the Calloway Circus. Will suggests that Jenny had an affair with his father, but she reveals that although she loved Edward, he remained faithful to Sandra.

Will returns home but learns Edward has had a stroke and stays with him at the hospital. Edward wakes up but, unable to speak much, explains the entire setting is what he saw in the witch's eye. Will starts to believe him as he becomes afraid, but he calms him by narrating what he always guessed Edward saw in the eye. Though struggling, Will tells his father of their imagined daring escape from the hospital to the nearby river, where everyone from Edward's past is there to see him off; Will carries Edward through the joyful crowd into the river, where Edward transforms into the giant catfish and swims away. Through telling this story, Will learns to forgive his father, who dies satisfied with his life.

At the funeral, Will and Joséphine are surprised when all the people from Edward's stories come to the service, though each one is slightly less fantastical than described. He asks for their accounts of Edward's stories, where they confirm the credibility but also fantasize his acts in return. Years later, Will passes on Edward's stories to his own son, helping him become "immortal".

Cast

Ewan McGregor as Edward Bloom (young)
Albert Finney as Edward Bloom (senior)
Billy Crudup as Will Bloom
Jessica Lange as Sandra Bloom (senior)
Helena Bonham Carter as Jenny (young & senior) / The Witch
Alison Lohman as Sandra Bloom (young), née Templeton
Robert Guillaume as Dr. Bennett (senior)
Marion Cotillard as Joséphine
Missi Pyle as Mildred
Matthew McGrory as Karl the Giant
David Denman as Don Price (age 18–22)
Loudon Wainwright III as Beamen
Ada Tai and Arlene Tai as Ping and Jing
Steve Buscemi as Norther Winslow
Danny DeVito as Amos Calloway
Deep Roy as Mr. Soggybottom
Perry Walston as Edward Bloom (age 10)
Hailey Anne Nelson as Jenny (age 8)
Grayson Stone as Will Bloom (age 6–8)
R. Keith Harris as Ed's Father
Karla Droege as Ed's Mother
Zachary Gardner as Zacky Price (age 10)
John Lowell as Donald "Don" Price (age 12)
Darrell Vanterpool as Wilbur (age 10)
Miley Cyrus as Ruthie (age 8)
Joseph Humphrey as Little Brave
Billy Redden as Banjo Man
Russell Hodgkinson as Some Farmer
Daniel Wallace as Econ. Professor
George McArthur as Colossus
Bevin Kaye as River Woman

Themes

The reconciliation of the father-son relationship between Edward and William is the key theme in Big Fish. Novelist Daniel Wallace's interest in the theme of the father-son relationship began with his own family. Wallace found the "charming" character of Edward Bloom similar to his father, who used charm to keep his distance from other people. In the film, Will believes Edward has never been honest with him because Edward creates extravagant myths about his past to hide himself, using storytelling as an avoidance mechanism. Edward's stories are filled with fairy tale characters (a witch, mermaid, giant, and werewolf) and places (the circus, small towns, the mythological town of Spectre), all of which are classic images and archetypes. The quest motif propels both Edward's story and Will's attempt to get to the bottom of it. Wallace explains: "The father's quest is to be a big fish in a big pond, and the son's quest is to see through his tall tales."

Screenwriter John August identified with Will's character and adapted it after himself. In college, August's father died, and like Will, August had attempted to get to know him before his death, but found it difficult. Like Will, August had studied journalism and was 28 years old. In the film, Will says of Edward, "I didn't see anything of myself in my father, and I don't think he saw anything of himself in me. We were like strangers who knew each other very well." Will's description of his relationship with Edward closely resembled August's own relationship with his father. Burton also used the film to confront his thoughts and emotions concerning the death of his father in 2000: "My father had been ill for a while ... I tried to get in touch with him, to have, like in this film, some sort of resolution, but it was impossible."

Religion and film scholar Kent L. Brintnall observes how the father-son relationship resolves itself at the end of the film. As Edward dies, Will finally lets go of his anger and begins to understand his father for the first time:

In a final gesture of love and comprehension, after a lifetime of despising his father's stories and his father as story-teller, Will finishes the story his father has begun, pulling together the themes, images and characters of his father's storied life to blend reality and fantasy in act of communion and care. By unselfishly releasing the anger he has held about his father's stories, Will gains the understanding that all we are is our stories and that his father's stories gave him a reality and substance and a dimension that was as real, genuine, and deep as the day-to-day experiences that Will sought out. Will comes to understand, then, that his father—and the rest of us—are our stories and that the deeper reality of our lives may, in fact, not be our truest self.

Production

Development 
About six months before it was published, screenwriter John August read a manuscript of Big Fish: A Novel of Mythic Proportions (1998) by author Daniel Wallace. August read the unpublished novel following the death of his father. In September 1998, August convinced Columbia Pictures to acquire the film rights on his behalf. August worked hard to make the episodic book into a cohesive screenplay, deciding on several narrators for the script. In August 2000, producers Bruce Cohen and Dan Jinks began discussions for Steven Spielberg to direct. Spielberg planned to have DreamWorks co-finance and distribute Big Fish with Columbia, and planned to have filming start in late 2001, after completing Minority Report (2002).

Spielberg courted Jack Nicholson for the role of Edward Bloom Sr. and towards this end, had August compose two additional drafts for Nicholson's part. August recalls: "There was this thought that there wasn't enough for Jack Nicholson to do in the movie so we built new sequences. Pieces got moved around, but it wasn't a lot of new stuff being created. It ended up being a really good intellectual exercise in my explaining and defending and reanalyzing pieces of the story." Spielberg eventually left Big Fish when he became involved with Catch Me If You Can (2002), and DreamWorks also backed out of the film.

With Spielberg no closer to committing, August, working with Jinks and Cohen, considered Stephen Daldry as a potential director. "Once Steven decided he wasn't going to do it, we put the script back to the way it was," recalls Jinks. "Steven even said, 'I think I made a mistake with a couple of things I asked you guys to try.'" August took his favorite elements from the previous drafts, coming up with what he called "a best-of Big Fish script". "By the time we approached Tim Burton, the script was in the best shape it had ever been."

Burton had never been particularly close to his parents, but his father's death in October 2000 and his mother's in March 2002 affected him deeply. Following the production of Planet of the Apes (2001), the director wanted to get back to making a smaller film. Burton enjoyed the script, feeling that it was the first unique story he was offered since Beetlejuice (1988). Burton also found appeal in the story's combination of an emotional drama with exaggerated tall tales, which allowed him to tell various stories of different genres. He signed to direct in April 2002, which prompted Richard D. Zanuck, who worked with Burton on Planet of the Apes, to join Big Fish as a producer. Zanuck also had a difficult relationship with his own father, Darryl F. Zanuck, who once fired him as head of production at 20th Century Fox.

Casting
For the role of Edward Bloom, Burton spoke with Jack Nicholson, Spielberg's initial choice for the role. Burton had previously worked with Nicholson on Batman (1989) and Mars Attacks! (1996). In order to depict Nicholson as the young Bloom, Burton intended to use a combination of computer-generated imagery and prosthetic makeup. The director then decided to cast around for the two actors in question. Jinks and Cohen, who were then working with Ewan McGregor on Down with Love (2003), suggested that Burton cast both McGregor and Albert Finney for Edward. Burton later compared McGregor's acting style to regular colleague Johnny Depp. Viewing Finney's performance in Tom Jones (1963), Burton found him similar to McGregor, and coincidentally found a People magazine article comparing the two. McGregor, being Scottish, found it easier performing with a Southern American English accent. "It's a much easier accent to do than a standard American accent because you can really hear it. You can get your teeth into it. Standard American is much harder because it's more lyrical." The same dual casting applied to the role of Bloom's wife, Sandra, who would be played by Jessica Lange and Alison Lohman. Burton commented that he was impressed with Lohman's performance in White Oleander (2002). Burton's girlfriend, Helena Bonham Carter, was also cast in two roles. Her prosthetic makeup for The Witch took five hours to apply. "I was pregnant throughout filming, so it was weird being a pregnant witch," the actress reflected. "I had morning sickness, so all those fumes and the make-up and the rubber ... it was hideous."

Burton personalized the film with several cameos. While filming in Alabama, the crew tracked down Billy Redden, one of the original banjo players from Deliverance (1972). Redden was working as a part-owner of a restaurant in Clayton, Georgia, and he agreed to reprise his role in the Spectre vignette. As Edward Bloom first enters the town, Redden can be seen on a porch plucking a few notes from "Dueling Banjos". Burton was pleased with the result: "If you're watching the film and don't recognise the solitary, enigmatic figure on the porch, that's fine. But if you do – well, it just makes me so happy to see him and I think other people will feel the same way." Original Big Fish author Daniel Wallace makes a brief appearance as Sandra's economics teacher in the "Courtship of Sandra Templeton" sequence.

Filming

Burton planned to start filming in October 2002, but principal photography in Alabama did not begin until January 13, 2003. Apart from filming in Paris for one week in May, Big Fish was entirely shot in Alabama, mostly in Wetumpka and Montgomery (such as the Cloverdale neighborhood). Brief filming also took place in Tallassee and on the campus of Huntingdon College. Scenes for the town of Spectre were filmed on a custom set located on Jackson Lake Island between Montgomery and Millbrook, Alabama, adjacent to the Alabama River. Principal photography for Big Fish in Alabama continued until the first week of April. and is estimated to have generated as much as $25 million for the local economy.

Burton filmed all the dramatic hospital scenes and most of those involving Finney first, before moving on to the McGregor section of Bloom's life. Although McGregor was on set from the beginning of filming, Burton chose to shoot all Finney's scenes first. Location filming in Alabama was delayed by inclement weather; during the Calloway circus scenes filming, a tornado watch was issued and flooding on the set interrupted filming for several weeks. Despite the delays, Burton delivered the film on budget and on schedule.

The director attempted to limit the use of digital effects. However, because he wanted to evoke a Southern Gothic fantasy tone for Big Fish, color grading techniques were applied by Sony Pictures Imageworks. Stan Winston Studios, with whom Burton worked with on Edward Scissorhands (1990) and Batman Returns (1992), designed Helena Bonham Carter's prosthetic makeup and created the animatronics. Scenes with Karl the Giant were commissioned using forced perspective filmmaking.

Music

The soundtrack was composed by regular Burton collaborator Danny Elfman. Burton approached Pearl Jam during post-production to request an original song for the soundtrack and closing credits. After screening an early print of the film, Pearl Jam vocalist Eddie Vedder wrote "Man of the Hour", completing the demo by the next day. It was recorded by the band four days later. Guitarist Mike McCready stated, "We were so blown away by the movie ... Eddie and I were standing around talking about it afterwards and were teary-eyed. We were so emotionally charged and moved by the imagination and humanity that we felt because of the movie."

Release
Columbia Pictures planned to wide release Big Fish in the United States on November 26, 2003 before pushing it back to December 10 for a limited release. The film premiered on December 4, 2003, at the Hammerstein Ballroom in Manhattan. The domestic wide release in the US came on January 9, 2004, with the film appearing in 2,406 theaters and earning $13.81 million in its opening weekend. The film eventually grossed $66.81 million in U.S. totals and $56.11 million in foreign countries, with a total of $122.92 million worldwide.

Critical response
Big Fish received positive reviews from film critics. Based on 219 reviews collected by Rotten Tomatoes, 75% of critics positively reviewed Big Fish, with an average score of 7.13/10. The site's consensus states: "A charming father-and-son tale filled with typical Tim Burton flourishes." Metacritic calculated an average score of 58/100, based on 43 reviews, indicating "mixed or average reviews". Audiences polled by CinemaScore gave the film an average grade of "B+" on an A+ to F scale.

Critics compared the film to Forrest Gump (1994). "Big Fish turns into a wide-eyed Southern Gothic picaresque in which each lunatic twist of a development is more enchanting than the last," Owen Gleiberman of Entertainment Weekly wrote. "It's like Forrest Gump without the bogus theme-park politics." Peter Travers from Rolling Stone magazine praised Burton's direction, feeling it was a celebration of the art of storytelling and a touching father–son drama.

Mike Clark of USA Today commented that he was most fascinated by the casting choices. "Equally delightful is the Alison Lohman character's evolution into an older woman (Jessica Lange). It's a metamorphosis to equal any in screen history." Internet reviewer James Berardinelli found the fairy tale approach reminiscent of The Princess Bride (1987) and the films of Terry Gilliam. "Big Fish is a clever, smart fantasy that targets the child inside every adult," Berardinelli said, "without insulting the intelligence of either." Roger Ebert, in a mixed review, wrote "there is no denying that Will has a point: The old man is a blowhard. There is a point at which his stories stop working as entertainment and segue into sadism." Richard Corliss of Time magazine was disappointed, finding the father-son reconciliation storyline to be over-dramatically cliché. "You recall The Boy Who Cried Wolf? Edward Bloom is the man who cried fish." Big Fish was No. 85 on Slant Magazine's best films of the 2000s.

Home media
The Region 1 DVD was released on April 27, 2004, and Region 2 was released on June 7. The DVD features a Burton audio commentary track, seven featurettes and a trivia quiz. A special edition was released on November 1, 2005, with a 24-page hardback book entitled Fairy Tale for a Grown Up. The film was released on Blu-ray Disc on March 20, 2007.

Accolades

Adaptations
A musical adaptation starring Norbert Leo Butz premiered in Chicago in April 2013.

References

Notes

Citations

Further reading

External links

 
 
 
 
 

2003 films
2000s fantasy comedy-drama films
American fantasy comedy-drama films
Columbia Pictures films
Fiction with unreliable narrators
Films based on American novels
Films based on fantasy novels
Films directed by Tim Burton
Films scored by Danny Elfman
Films set in Alabama
Films set in Paris
Films set in the 1940s
Films set in the 1950s
Films set in the 1960s
Films set in the 1970s
Films set in the 1980s
Films shot in Alabama
Films produced by Richard D. Zanuck
Films about giants
Korean War films
Magic realism films
Southern Gothic films
Films with screenplays by John August
Films about fish
American werewolf films
Films about witchcraft
2003 comedy-drama films
The Zanuck Company films
Twins in fiction
Films about father–son relationships
2000s English-language films
Films produced by Bruce Cohen
2000s American films